The 1979 Dartmouth Big Green football team represented Dartmouth College in the 1979 NCAA Division I-A football season.

Schedule

Roster

References

Dartmouth
Dartmouth Big Green football seasons
Dartmouth Big Green football